The Fiat Multipla (Type 186) is a six-seater car produced by Italian automaker Fiat from 1998 to 2010. Based on the Bravo/Brava, the Multipla was shorter and wider than its rivals. It had two rows of three seats, where its compact MPV competitors had two across front seating. The Multipla is shorter than the three-door Bravo/Brava on which it was based, yet it offered increased seating and cargo volume. Sales commenced in Italy in November 1998.

In common with a number of other modern Fiats, the Multipla reused the name of an earlier vehicle, in this case the "Multipla" variant of the Fiat 600 produced during the 1950s and 1960s.

The Multipla was assembled and marketed in China from 2008 to 2013 under license by Zotye Auto as the Zotye M300 Langyue, using knock-down kits from Italy. Zotye also sold a total of 220 all-electric versions of the M300.

Design

The exterior and interior design of the Multipla were displayed at the Museum of Modern Art (MOMA) in New York during its "Different Roads – Automobiles for the Next Century" exhibition in 1999.

It won the Top Gear  Car of the Year (2000), as well as the "More beautiful Car in the world" in the same programme's awards. It was also voted Top Gear Magazine Family Car of the Year for four years in a row, from 2001 to 2004. In July 2000, in the series finale of Clarkson's Car Years, it was awarded "Family Car of the Moment". 

Multipla sales began in Italy in November 1998, with most other markets receiving it a year later. The Multipla sold well with Italian buyers, but sales elsewhere were less successful. 

The Multipla underwent a major facelift in March 2004, in an attempt to shed its original styling for a more restrained look. This was with the intention of attracting more buyers, but failed to garner critical acclaim. Upon the subsequent restyling, The Daily Telegraph reported designers were "desperately sad that the new Multipla no longer resembles a psychotic cartoon duck," and "while passengers loved the adaptability of the clever interior, they were less keen on the sarcastic sneers and derisive laughter of their neighbours, friends and schoolmates; children can be cruel." 

The Telegraph placed it #2 on its list of the 100 Ugliest Cars in August 2008, saying "Derided for the blandness of its output during the 1980s and early 1990s, Fiat dared to start thinking outside the box. In this case, however, it simply added wheels to the box." The Multipla was also named the ugliest car of all time by readers of Car Throttle in January 2014. In February 2018, The Sunday Times named it on a list of ugliest cars, saying "The tragedy of the Multipla is that its Elephant Man esque exterior enclosed a genuinely clever and spacious interior, and it wasn't bad to drive, either. It's a shame, then, that you'd rather walk than be seen in it."

Engines
A 1.6 engine, that could be powered on either methane or standard petrol, was offered in certain markets.

Trim levels

United Kingdom

 Multipla SX: basic model available with petrol or diesel engines.
 Multipla ELX: added Air Conditioning, Twin Electric Sunroofs, alloy wheels and electric rear windows, as well as special wipe clean, brightly coloured seats.

In June 2004, when the Multipla received its facelift, these trim levels were later replaced with Dynamic, Dynamic Family, Dynamic Plus.

Practicality
The new generation Multipla was praised by journalists at its launch for its flexibility. The Multipla’s three abreast seating configuration allows for adjustment of the front seats, and the removal and relocation of the rear seats into many formats.

Zotye M300
From December 2008 to September 2010, Zotye Auto had assembled Multipla 2 from KD kits, in its factory in Changshan, and marketed it in China as the Zotye Multiplan. In October 2010, Zotye started to build a version of Multipla 2, employing more locally made parts in order to reduce costs; the new version is called "Langyue" in China. There are 2 types: M300 (Engine powered) and M300 EV (see below) which is electric.

Vilebrequin 1000tipla

On September 24, 2020, Sylvain Levy and Pierre Chabrier, who created the YouTube channel Vilebrequin, focused on cars, announced their project to make a Fiat Multipla exceed the 1000 horsepower mark. The project was named 1000tipla.

The base is a Multipla JTD with over 300,000 kilometers on it, which the two videographers purchased in 2018 for a test drive. Prior to the project, the vehicle underwent various cosmetic modifications, as well as a reprogramming. The vehicle was then ironically named MultiplAMG.

The 1000tipla project is financed through a crownfunding, on the KissKissBankBank platform. The launch of the fund was a success: 300 000 € were collected in 24 hours, beating the European record of fundraising over this period. In the end, more than a million euros were raised, exceeding the initial goal of 50,000 euros requested by the video makers.

Before the announcement of the crownfunding is announced the purchase of a "donor" vehicle and the money of the fund will finance the modification of the engine of the new vehicle, in order to reach the objective of 1000 horsepower. The vehicle in question is revealed in November 2020: it is a Corvette C7 Z06, originally destined to be scrapped following an accident with a Dodge Ram.

The transformation of the vehicle is provided by the car preparer W - Autosport, based on the Nevers Magny-Cours's track. The duo also enlisted the services of Japanese designer Kei Miura to create a custom body kit. On July 7, 2022, the chain announced a major partnership with Michelin. The project is called 1000tipla by Michelin. This announcement provoked the discontent of a part of the YouTube channel's fan community, who did not like the arrival of the tire manufacturer as a dominant partner, and the change in the vehicle's livery caused by this partnership.

On October 13, 2022, the two videographers came back to the controversy generated by this partnership, and announced a change of livery, closer to the one originally planned.

From October 18, to October 23, 2022, The 1000Tipla was on display at the 2022 Paris Motor Show.

On February 23, 2023, the power of the vehicle is revealed, totaling 1294 horsepower and 1581 Nm of torque.

References

External links

Fiat Multipla Official United Kingdom Site
Fiat Multipla Owner's Manual (1st generation)

Multipla
Euro NCAP small MPVs
Compact MPVs
Station wagons
2000s cars
2010s cars
Front-wheel-drive vehicles
Cars introduced in 1998